The first USS Absecon (ID-3131) was a freighter that operated in the United States Navy in 1918. She was the first U.S. Navy ship to be named for Absecon Inlet, a small inlet north of Atlantic City, New Jersey.

On 17 June 1918, officers of the U.S. Navys 4th Naval District inspected Absecon, a single-screw, steel-hulled freighter built in 1918 by the New York Shipbuilding Company in Camden, New Jersey. Although the Navy gave the ship Identification Number (Id. No.) 3131, as it did with most commercial cargo ships and tankers commissioned into U.S. Navy service for use in World War I, the United States Government never took possession of the ship. However, she was armed, and a Navy armed guard crew was placed on board the ship.

Absecon earned the World War I Victory Medal with Armed Guard Clasp for service between 12 October 1918 and 5 November 1918. She then left naval service.

References

Ships built by New York Shipbuilding Corporation
World War I auxiliary ships of the United States
1918 ships
Cargo ships of the United States Navy